Vidrade is a Ukrainian place name which can refer to:
 Vidradne (urban-type settlement), an urban-type settlement in Crimea
 Vidradne, Zaporizhia Raion, a rural settlement in Zaporizhia Oblast